Nazia may refer to:

Nazia and Zoheb, pioneers of the Pakistani pop music scene during the 1980s
Nazia Khanum (born 1943), British management consultant and researcher
Nazia Hassan (1965–2000), Pakistani pop singer
Nazia Sadiq (born 1976), Pakistani Pashto singer
Nazia Nazir (born 1978), Pakistani cricketer
Nazia Iqbal (born 1980), Pakistani Pashto singer
Nazia Mogra (born 1985), English television journalist

See also
Camera Camera (Nazia and Zohaib Hassan album)
Hotline (Nazia and Zohaib Hassan album)
Naziya, aka Nazia, urban settlement outside St. Petersburg, Russia
Nazia Hassan Foundation, established by Nazia Hassan's parents, sister Zahra, brother and son